The Bravery Order is a service award conferred by the 
Government of Vietnam for "brave acts to save people or property of the State and/or the people".

The Bravery Order shall be conferred or posthumously conferred on individuals, officers and soldiers, militia and the strata, regardless of age, to act courageously rescuing people and property of the State, people; reached one of the following criteria:

 Not afraid of taking lives, determined to save lives and property of the State, to meet people's fires, natural calamities, bravely protecting state property, lives and property of citizens before the four criminal or brave volunteers in dangerous places caused by the disease to protect the lives of the people's achievements encourage work, education, set a bright example in the provinces, cities, or more areas.
 Who died while heroically rescuing people and property of the State and the people respected, examples, and learning.

See also 
 Vietnam awards and decorations

References

Orders, decorations, and medals of Vietnam
Military awards and decorations of Vietnam
Awards established in 2003
2003 establishments in Vietnam